The Soviet Plateau is the highest part of the glacial cover of East Antarctica, located within 75–84° south latitude and 25–105° east longitude. According to the Atlas of the Antarctic (1966, p. XX), the central point of the Soviet plateau has coordinates .

The plateau has a length of 2,000 km, and a width of roughly 450 km. The height on the outskirts is approximately 3,500 m, increasing to around 4,004 m in the central region where the Gamburtsev Subglacial Mountains are located. The ice cover has a thickness of 750 to 3,800 m. The average annual air temperature is below -56 °C; On July 21, 1983, -89.2 °C (-128.56 °F) was recorded at Vostok Station, make it the lowest temperature on  Earth ever recorded. At the same time, the temperature on the glacier bed is around 0 °C and the lakes are formed under the ice. The largest of these known lakes was found in the area of the Vostok station (Lake Vostok). Soviet expeditions conducted pioneer plateau research in the years 1957–1959.

References

External links 
 Atlas of the Antarctic / Redcol. Ch. ed. E. I. Tolstikov. - Moscow — Leningrad: Main Directorate of Geodesy and Cartography of the USSR MG, 1966. - V. 1. - P. 19–20. - 3000 copies The Soviet plateau is also shown on some other pages of this atlas.

Plateaus of Antarctica
East Antarctica